{{DISPLAYTITLE:C28H48O2}}
The molecular formula C28H48O2 (molar mass: 416.68 g/mol, exact mass: 416.3654 u) may refer to:

 β-Tocopherol
 γ-Tocopherol